Boyukabad (also Romanized as Boyūkābād; also known as Bābūkābād, Būbūkābād, and Būyūkābād) is a village in Chah Dasht Rural District, Shara District, Hamadan County, Hamadan Province, Iran. At the 2006 census, its population was 1,408, in 326 families.

References 

Populated places in Hamadan County